George William Brown (May 30, 1860 – February 17, 1919) was a Canadian politician and the second Lieutenant Governor of Saskatchewan from 1910 to 1915.

He was elected to the 3rd North-West Legislative Assembly, 4th North-West Legislative Assembly, and 5th North-West Legislative Assembly in the electoral division of North Regina.

References
 

1860 births
1919 deaths
Lieutenant Governors of Saskatchewan
Members of the Legislative Assembly of the Northwest Territories